Camaldoli may refer to:

 Camaldoli, frazione of the comune of Poppi, in Tuscany, Italy
 Camaldoli (Campagna), hamlet of the comune of Campagna in the Province of Salerno, Campania, Italy
 Camaldoli hill, the highest point of the city of Naples, Campania, Italy
 Hermitage of Camaldoli, a monastery near Naples, Campania, Italy